NGC 454 is a pair of interacting galaxies located in the constellation Phoenix. John Herschel discovered it on October 5, 1834. It was described by Dreyer as "very faint, small, round, brighter middle."

References

External links
 

0454
18341005
Phoenix (constellation)
Interacting galaxies
4461/4468